Bretagne Réunie, formerly CUAB (Comité pour l'unité administrative de la Bretagne; Committee for the administrative unity of Brittany) is a federation of associations and individuals whose goal is the administrative reunification of Brittany (the re-attachment of the Loire-Atlantique department to the region of Brittany). This department is currently part of the Pays de la Loire region.

Loire-Atlantique is a department which was created after the French revolution, taking approximately the territory of Pays nantais. Historically it was part of the nine traditional évêchés of Brittany. It is currently a part of the region of Pays de la Loire which was created in 1955.

The current president of the General Council of Loire-Atlantique, Patrick Mareschal was the first president of the CUAB. The subsequent presidents of the organisation were: Pierre-Yves Le Rhun, Jean Cevaér, Alain Grand-Guillot and Emile Granville. The current president is Jean-Yves Bourriau.

Breton nationalism